The 1964 season of the Venezuelan Primera División, the top category of Venezuelan football, was played by 6 teams. The national champions were Galicia.

Results

First stage

Second stage

Aggregate Table

Championship play-off

External links
Venezuela 1964 season at RSSSF

Ven
Venezuelan Primera División seasons
1964 in Venezuelan sport